Lawrence B. Mohr (born May 5, 1931) is an American political scientist and Professor Emeritus of Political Science and Public Policy in the Gerald R. Ford School of Public Policy at the University of Michigan. He served on the University of Michigan's faculty from 1966 until retiring on May 31, 1999. Previously, he was half of the folk/blues musical duo Odetta and Larry, along with Odetta, whom he first met in 1953.

References

External links
Faculty page

Living people
1931 births
American political scientists
Gerald R. Ford School of Public Policy faculty
People from Los Angeles
University of Chicago alumni
University of Michigan alumni